The Rand index or Rand measure (named after William M. Rand) in statistics, and in particular in data clustering, is a measure of the similarity between two data clusterings. A form of the Rand index may be defined that is adjusted for the chance grouping of elements, this is the adjusted Rand index. From a mathematical standpoint, Rand index is related to the accuracy, but is applicable even when class labels are not used.

Rand index

Definition

The Rand index, is:

Since the denominator is the total number of pairs, the Rand index represents the frequency of occurrence
of agreements over the total pairs, or the probability that  and 
will agree on a randomly chosen pair.

Similarly, one can also view the Rand index as a measure of the percentage of correct decisions made by the algorithm. It can be computed using the following formula:

Properties
The Rand index has a value between 0 and 1, with 0 indicating that the two data clusterings do not agree on any pair of points and 1 indicating that the data clusterings are exactly the same.

In mathematical terms, a, b, c, d are defined as follows:

, where 
, where 
, where 
, where 

for some

Relationship with classification accuracy

Adjusted Rand index
The adjusted Rand index is the corrected-for-chance version of the Rand index. Such a correction for chance establishes a baseline by using the expected similarity of all pair-wise comparisons between clusterings specified by a random model.  Traditionally, the Rand Index was corrected using the Permutation Model for clusterings (the number and size of clusters within a clustering are fixed, and all random clusterings are generated by shuffling the elements between the fixed clusters).  However, the premises of the permutation model are frequently violated; in many clustering scenarios, either the number of clusters or the size distribution of those clusters vary drastically.  For example, consider that in K-means the number of clusters is fixed by the practitioner, but the sizes of those clusters are inferred from the data. Variations of the adjusted Rand Index account for different models of random clusterings.

Though the Rand Index may only yield a value between 0 and +1, the adjusted Rand index can yield negative values if the index is less than the expected index.

The contingency table

Definition
The original Adjusted Rand Index using the Permutation Model is

where  are values from the contingency table.

See also
 Simple matching coefficient

References

External links 
 C++ implementation with MATLAB mex files

Summary statistics for contingency tables
Clustering criteria